William Borlase (1589 – 15 December 1630) of Little Marlow and Bockmer, Buckinghamshire was an English politician who sat in the House of Commons in 1614 and from 1628 to 1629.

Borlase was the eldest son of William Borlase of Bockmer and Little Marlow, and his wife, Mary Backhouse. He matriculated at Magdalen College, Oxford on 22 June 1604, aged 15, and succeeded his father in 1629, a year before his own death.

In 1614, he was elected Member of Parliament for Wycombe. He was knighted at Warwick on 5 September 1617. In 1628 he was elected MP for Wycombe again.

Borlase died at the age of about 42. He had married Amy Popham, daughter of Sir Francis Popham, and was the father of three sons, including Sir John Borlase, 1st Baronet; and William Borlase, MP for Marlow; and two daughters. His widow later married courtier Gabriel Hippesley.

References

 

1589 births
1630 deaths
Alumni of Magdalen College, Oxford
People from Wycombe District
English MPs 1614
English MPs 1628–1629